Jean Wintsch (1880–1943) was a medical doctor, anarchist, and neo-Malthusian who founded the Lausanne Ferrer School.

References

Bibliography 

 
 
 Jean Batou, Mauro Cerutti, Charles Heimberg, Pour une histoire des gens sans histoire : ouvriers, exclus et rebelles en Suisse, 19e-20e siècles, Éditions d'en bas, 1995.
 Claude Cantini, Charles Heimberg, Pour une histoire sociale et antifasciste : contributions d'un autodidacte, Éditions d'en bas, 1999.

External links 

 Catalog at the Centre International de Recherches sur l'Anarchisme

1880 births
1943 deaths
People from Lausanne
Swiss anarchists
20th-century Swiss physicians
Emigrants from the Russian Empire to Switzerland